Kovalets is a Ukrainian surname. Notable people with the surname include:

 Kyrylo Kovalets (born 1993), Ukrainian footballer
 Serhiy Kovalets (born 1968), Ukrainian footballer

See also
 
 Koval (surname)
 Kowalec, a Polish cognate

Ukrainian-language surnames